Horst Günther (23 September 1920 – 6 April 1944) was a German World War II prisoner of war. An Afrika Korps Gefreiter, he was "captured on 9 May 1943 in Tunisia [and] murdered in Camp Aiken prisoner-of-war camp, South Carolina" United States, by fellow prisoners.

He was suspected of collaborating with the American authorities and was strangled by two fellow prisoners-of-war, Erich Gauss and Rudolf Staub, who hung his body from a tree in order to make it seem that Günther had killed himself. Gauss and Staub were hanged on 14 July 1945 at Fort Leavenworth, Kansas. They were buried in the prison cemetery. Staub is alleged to have said just before his execution: "What I did was done as a German soldier under orders. If I had not done so, I would have been punished when I returned to Germany."

See also 

 List of people executed by the United States military

Notes and references

1920 births
1944 deaths
German Army personnel killed in World War II
German prisoners of war in World War II held by the United States
German people who died in prison custody
Prisoners who died in United States military detention
Prisoners murdered in custody
German people murdered abroad
People murdered in South Carolina
German Army soldiers of World War II